The Hyundai Chorus (hangul:현대 코러스) is a minibus built by Hyundai Motor Company. The range was primarily available as tourist buses.

Most models of the bus are distinguishable by a front 'Chorus' badge, but the common Hyundai badge is usually used on the rear.

In Japan, Asia-Pacific, Mid-East, Africa, Europe, South America, its principal competitor is Asia Combi.

Models
1st generation: Hyundai Motor Company & Mitsubishi Fuso design, platform and also called Hyundai Mighty, manufacture period: 1988-1994
2nd generation: Hyundai Motor Company & Mitsubishi Fuso design, manufacture period: 1994-1998
Chorus Private (16/25 passengers)
Chorus Tour (16/25 passengers)
Chorus Town (16 passengers)

Cultural Influences
The Hyundai Chorus is mentioned in Steven Laine's book Iconoclast.

See also

Hyundai Motor Company
Hyundai DQ-7
Hyundai County
 List of buses

References

Buses of South Korea
Rear-wheel-drive vehicles
Minibuses
Hyundai buses